Enewetak was a grindcore band formed in Orange, California, in 1994. Enewetak has been called "one of the most progressive hardcore bands of the mid-to-late nineties, overshadowing its contemporaries such as Unruh and Suicide Nation."

From humble beginnings in garages and coffee houses, Enewetak went on to gain international acclaim for its unique sound and ever-evolving style. Over the course of the band's ten-year career, Enewetak released three full-length studio albums, as well as four seven-inch records and a DVD.

Name 
Enewetak took its name from an atoll in the Marshall Islands.

Sound 
Enewetak's sound has been described as "brutal hardcore", as well as "damn heavy, with huge roaring grooves and ferocious vocals"

Line up 
The original line up of Enewetak consisted of Forrest Locke on vocals -from Orange, CA, Jim Greco on guitar-currently in Florida, Graham Day on guitar, Toby Sterrett on bass guitar and Ben Fall on drums. Fall left the band in early 1995 and was replaced by Patrick Bonfrisco. The following year, Day was replaced by Jack Fitzgerald.

In 1995, the band recorded and released a self-titled seven inch record on Revolutionary Power Tools Records. The following year, Enewetak's first full-length album, And The Beat Goes On, was released on the same label.

Enewetak later recorded additional seven-inch records (including a split with Unruh) and two more full-length albums. Guns. Elvis Loved Them. was released through Kiss of Steel records in 1996 and Onward to Valhalla, the band's only CD, was recorded and released in 1997. During this time, the line up changed slightly, as Javier Van Huss filled in during Sterrett's hiatus, and several guitarists, including Chris Smith and Scooter Funcheon, took over for Fitzgerald while he was away for two years. Myles Sterrett later joined the band as the permanent guitarist.

They reunited in 2015 and played in Garden Grove, California and in Scottsdale, Arizona.

Discography

Aftermath 
Since the band's final show in 2004, many of the members have joined or started new projects. Locke and the Sterretts were founding members of The Accident. Locke and Toby Sterrett later went on to create Tafkata. Bonfrisco joined The Touching Game in 1999 and Run. Dash. Sprint. in 2002. Jim moved to Jacksonville, Florida; his current projects include Cursed Ruin, Extremely Rotten, Saturnine, Vomikaust and Slounge.

Reunion 
To celebrate the 20 year anniversary of the band's first seven-inch, enewetak is reuniting for a show in Phoenix, Arizona, in April 2015.

References

External links 
 Tafkata Site

American grindcore musical groups
Heavy metal musical groups from California
Musical groups from Orange County, California